This is a list of historic landmarks in Albuquerque, New Mexico, as designated by the City Council. To date 24 individual properties (two of which are no longer standing) have been so designated.  Historic landmarks may not be demolished or significantly altered without approval from the Landmarks and Urban Conservation Commission.

There are entire neighborhoods that fall under historic landmark classifications, for a more comprehensive list of their historic landmarks see their respective pages: Barelas, Old Town Albuquerque, Nob Hill, and Los Ranchos de Albuquerque. Also take note of historic parts of the broader Albuquerque metropolitan area, including Belen, Bosque Farms, Corrales, Cuba, Isleta Village Proper, Los Lunas, Peralta, and Rio Rancho.

Historic landmarks
Properties are also listed on the National Register of Historic Places (NR) or New Mexico State Register of Cultural Properties (SR) as noted.

Former landmarks

See also
New Mexico State Register of Cultural Properties
National Register of Historic Places listings in New Mexico

References

History of Albuquerque, New Mexico
 
Albuquerque, New Mexico
Albuquerque
Lists of buildings and structures in New Mexico